After the introduction of movable printing type to Europe by Johannes Gutenberg in Germany (circa 1439), Armenians from throughout the diaspora began to publish Armenian-language books. The first book which had Armenian letters was published in Mainz (Germany) in 1486. The first Armenian book to be published by the printing press was Urbatagirq—Book of Friday prayers—which was published by Hakob Meghapart in Venice in 1512.

History 

In the 16th century there were published 31 books, in 17th  century – 164 and in 18th there were 824 Armenian books printed.

 The first Armenian book was published by Hakob Meghapart in 1512 in Venice (Italy). The book was called «Ուրբաթագիրք» ("Urpatakirk", "Friday Book").
 Abgar Dpir Tokhatetsi published an Armenian book in Constantinople (Ottoman Empire) in 1568.
 The first Armenian printing house in Persia was established in New Julfa (Isfahan, Iran) in 1636. The first book to be published in this printing house was «Սաղմոսարան» ("Saghmosaran", "Psalter"); it was published in 1638 by Khachatur Kesaratsi, while the first Persian book in Persia was published 192 years later in 1830.
 The first Armenian printing house in Armenia was established in Vagharshapat in 1771 and the first book was called «Զբօսարան Հոգեւոր» ("Zbosaran Hogevor", "Spiritual walking"); it was published in 1772 by Simeon I of Yerevan.
The first Armenian printing house in Yerevan was established in 1876 by Z. Hakobyan. In 1880 E. Ter-Grigoryan became director of the printing house and worked there until the 1910s. The first book printed in the printing house was E. Ter-Grigoryan's "Trchnik" ("Small Bird") collection.
 The first Armenian printing house in Russia was set up in Saint Petersburg in 1781. Grigor Khaldariants' had type sent from London, and under the sponsorship of the Primate of Armenians in Russia, Bishop Hovsep' Arghutian, he edited the first Armenian book to be published in the Tsarist realm, «Տետրակ այբբենական» ("Tetrak aybbenakan", "ABC Reader") in 1781. He then printed works such as «Բանալի գիտութեան» ("Banali Gitut'ean", "The Key to Science"), «Շաւիղ լեզվագիտութեան» ("Shavigh Lezvagitut'ean", "Linguistic Guide"), and «Ընդհանրական»("Endhanrakan", "Encyclical Letter") by Nersés Shnorhali.

20th century 
After the sovietization of Armenia, Yerevan becoming the center of the Armenian printing, where in 1921 organized by the State Publishing House. It assumes the functions of editing and organization publications. Makes its political, artistic, scientific, publications for children with relatively large circulations. Separated from the State Publishing House publishing house “Luys” (Light), specialized mainly in the publication of textbooks. In 1964 from publishing Armenian State Publishing House (HayPetHrap) was renamed “Hayastan” (Armenia).  In 1976 have been separated from the last publishing “Sovetakan Grogh” (Soviet writer), which it published in the most artistic and literary works. Academy of Science of Armenian SSR published a monograph of scientific and other research literature, and publish works of Armenian classical and scientific texts from the Matenadaran as well. Publishing house of  Yerevan State University publishes textbooks, collections and scientific monographs since 1922. From this period also involved in publishing the National Library, “Gitelik” (knowledge) and several others. In 1980 have acted in Yerevan on 20 printers. From 1922 until the end of 1970 in Armenia were published about 45 thousand titles of books. In the last years of Soviet power in Armenia each year were printed about 1,100 titles. During this period, books and periodicals published in the Armenian language as in other republics of the USSR.

Since 1920 (the sovietization of Armenia) to the 1980s main centers of the Armenian printing press in the diaspora were  Istanbul, Cairo and Beirut (the latter now is its main center). At this moment the Armenian Diaspora was published about 21 thousand titles. Total number of items of Armenian newspapers in 1512 and 1980, more than 80 thousand.

Armenian printing houses worldwide 

The following table is a list of the Armenian printing houses from 1512 to 1800.

See also
 Global spread of the printing press
 Armenian literature

References

External links

 Armenian Rare Books 1512-1800
 HyeEtch: The Art of The Book: Printing and Engraving

Armenian literature
History of printing
Printing
Armenian culture